Afgekia sericea is a species of flowering plant in the family Fabaceae, native to Thailand. It was first described by William Grant Craib  in 1927. It is a liana.

References

Wisterieae
Flora of Thailand
Plants described in 1927